The football (soccer) Campeonato Brasileiro Série B 1994, the second level of Brazilian National League, was played from August 7 to December 4, 1994. The competition had 24 clubs and two of them were promoted to Série A and two were relegated to Série C. The competition was won by Juventude.

The championship was reestablished after the 1993 Campeonato Brasileiro, and its participants included the eight teams relegated from the 1993 Série A, along with 16 teams chosen through qualificatory tournaments. However, with América-MG's suspension, Democrata, that had been eliminated in the qualification, was chosen to take América's place. Juventude beat Goiás in the final match, and was declared 1994 Brazilian Série B champions, and both Goiás and Juventude achieved promotion to the 1995 Série A. The two worst ranked teams (Fortaleza and Tiradentes-DF) were relegated to play Série C in 1995.

Qualification

Southern Region

Rio Grande do Sul

Santa Catarina

Paraná

Southern triangular

São Paulo

Group A

Group B

Rio de Janeiro

Goiás-Tocantins

Minas Gerais-Federal District

Minas Gerais

Federal District

Final

Northern Region

Acre-Amazonas

Mato Grosso-Rondônia

Final

Pará-Amapá

Ceará-Rio Grande do Norte

Paraíba-Alagoas

Pernambuco

Sergipe-Bahia

Maranhão-Piauí

Maranhão
Imperatriz, with no chances at qualifying, did not appear for its final match against Sampaio Corrêa. As punishment, the result of its final match was counted as a 1-0 victory for Sampaio Corrêa, and the point earned against in the draw against Sampaio Corrêa in the first match was given to Sampaio Corrêa, tying it and Moto Club in number of points, forcing an extra match, won by Moto Club by 2-1.

Piauí

Finals

First phase

Group A

Group B

Group C

Group D

Second phase

Group E

Group F

Group G

Group H

Semifinals

Finals

References

Sources

Campeonato Brasileiro Série B seasons
1994 in Brazilian football leagues